Naguman is a village at the Northern end of Peshawar District in Khyber Pakhtunkhwa of Pakistan in the peaceful outskirts of Peshawar city on main Charsadda Road.

Overview 
It is home to Ultra Light Flying Sports Club and Government degree college.

Educational Institutes 
 Government Degree College Naguman Peshawar

See also 
 Peshawar
 Peshawar District
 Mathra

References 

Populated places in Peshawar District